Patricia Labee (born 4 April 1977) is a Dutch female professional beach volleyball and indoor volleyball player. She was born in Rotterdam.

Labee played ten seasons at Dutch highest league participants Sliedrecht Sport. She also played one season in Italy at Vicenza in the A1 and finally another season in the Netherlands at AMVJ.

She started her international beach volleyball career in 2005 and teamed up with Mered de Vries. Together they finished 5th in only their third international tournament in Alba Adriatica. Later in Phuket they reached the same position. In 2006 their highest position was 7 at the Cyprus tournament.

She also played one tournament (Cesenatico) of the Italian National Beach Volleyball Championship with Giulia Momoli where they took the third place.

Patricia Labee created her own sport clothing brand named STAR by GL together with her Italian partner Gian Maria Gasparri. The brand was founded in 2009 and is mainly focussing on volleyball, beach volleyball and basketball.

References 
 Official site
 FIVB profile
 STAR by GL

1977 births
Living people
Dutch women's beach volleyball players
Sportspeople from Rotterdam